Stanislav Vasilyevich Chaplygin (born 10 February 1967) is a retired Russian professional football player.

Club career
He made his Russian Football National League debut for FC Metallurg Novokuznetsk on 9 May 1992 in a game against FC Sakhalin Yuzhno-Sakhalinsk. He also played in the FNL for Metallurg in 1993.

Honours
 Russian Second Division Zone East top scorer: 1999 (23 goals), 2000 (13 goals).

External links
 

1967 births
Sportspeople from Barnaul
Living people
Soviet footballers
Russian footballers
FC Sibir Novosibirsk players
FC Dynamo Barnaul players
Association football midfielders
FC Novokuznetsk players